Acuminatella is a genus of gondolellid conodonts. Fossils have been found in the Pardonet Formation in the Schooler Creek Group in the Western Canadian Sedimentary Basin.

References

External links 

Ozarkodinida genera
Triassic conodonts
Late Triassic fish
Fossils of Canada
Triassic fish of North America
Carnian genus first appearances
Norian genus extinctions